Final Frontier may refer to:

Places
Outer space, especially from the perspective of space colonization
 "The final frontier", a description of space used in the opening narration of the science fiction TV series Star Trek
Deep sea, a final frontier for exploration and ocean colonization on Earth

Literature, films, and TV
Star Trek V: The Final Frontier, the fifth feature film based on Star Trek
Final Frontier, a Star Trek novel by Diane Carey
Final Frontier, a scenario on the expansion pack Civilization IV: Beyond the Sword for the video game Civilization IV
"The Final Frontier" (Mad About You), the final episode (later split into two parts) of the 1990s American sitcom Mad About You
The Final Frontier, a 2012 episode of Castle, in which a woman is murdered after attempting to reestablish the TV series Nebula Nine

Music
The Final Frontier, Iron Maiden's fifteenth studio album, released in the summer of 2010
"Satellite 15... The Final Frontier", a song from the above album
The Final Frontier (Keel album), an album by heavy metal band Keel 
"Final Frontier" (song), a single from American rapper MC Ren from the 1992 album Kizz My Black Azz
"Final Frontier", a song by RJD2 from his 2002 album Deadringer
"Final Frontier", the theme song to the sitcom Mad About You, sung by Andrew Gold
"Final Frontier", an album by Mars Lasar released in 2003
"Final Frontier", a track by Thomas Bergersen from his album Sun

Other uses
Final Frontier (game), a 1980 miniatures game

See also
 Final (disambiguation)
 Frontier (disambiguation)